Mario Wálter González (born 27 May 1950) was a professional footballer with Uruguayan club C.A. Peñarol and was part of the Uruguayan Squad at the World Cup in Germany in 1974. He played as a defender.

References

1950 births
Living people
Uruguayan footballers
Uruguay international footballers
1974 FIFA World Cup players
Uruguayan Primera División players
Peñarol players

Association football defenders